San José is the first canton in the province of San José in Costa Rica. It includes the national capital city of San José.

The canton lies on a fertile plain at the eastern end of the Central Valley (Valle Central). The Virilla River and Torres River form the border on the north, while the Tiribí River marks the southern boundary. The canton encompasses San José city, composed by all of its districts, albeit partially Uruca, although the Greater Metropolitan Area reaches far beyond in all directions.

The Mayor of San José Canton is Johnny Araya Monge (Partido Liberación Nacional).

Geography 
San José has an area of  km² and a mean elevation of  metres.

Districts 
The canton of San José is subdivided into the following districts:
 Carmen
 Merced
 Hospital
 Catedral
 Zapote
 San Francisco de Dos Ríos
 Uruca
 Mata Redonda
 Pavas
 Hatillo
 San Sebastián

Demographics 

For the 2011 census, San José had a population of  inhabitants. 

Most of the population is distributed in the peripheral districts around the downtown (the districts of El Carmen, Merced, Hospital, and Catedral are known as  similar to a downtown or financial center, only 18% of the canton population inhabits these districts).

San José had, in 2011, 0.90 men per woman. In 2000 the province had a 100% of urban population. 17.33% of its inhabitants are under 10 years old, and 7.67% over 65.

Transportation

Road transportation 
The canton is covered by the following road routes:

Rail transportation 
The Interurbano Line operated by Incofer goes through this canton.

References

External links

 
Cantons of San José Province
Greater Metropolitan Area (Costa Rica)